The Inedito World Tour was the sixth world tour by Italian singer Laura Pausini, supporting her eleventh studio album Inedito / Inédito. It was planned to visit America, Europe and Australia, but ended on 15 September 2012, after Pausini announcing she was pregnant. Because of the announcement, the tour was cut short, and plans for a second American leg, a second European leg and visiting Australia for the first time, were cancelled.

Background information 
On 30 December 2010, Pausini announced her eleventh studio album, Inedito / Inédito, set to be released both in Italian and Spanish on 11 November 2011. The title and the tracklist of the album were announced through Pausini's website on 10 September 2011. The first single from the album, "Benvenuto" / "Bienvenido", was released on 12 September 2011. The album was released on 11 November 2011; then, Pausini embarked in her sixth world tour starting in Italy during the last two weeks of December and going back to South America and Europe during the first semester of 2012. The tour was expected to return to South America in late 2012.

On 18 March 2012 show, the videoclip of the song Mi tengo debuted, playing on the videowall of that same song.

Pausini confirmed that the DVD in Spanish of the tour was recorded on 20 April 2012 in Madrid.

About the tour 

In order to promote the album, Pausini engaged a World Tour, starting with 11 shows in Italy in late December 2011. The tour reached South America in January–February 2012 (returning to countries like Venezuela where just performed once 14 years ago during the World Wide Tour 1997) and traveling during March–May the European leg of her tour. According to her words it was to have been one of her largest world tours ever made (expected to be more extensive than her last World Tour 2009).

The stage, where a classic Italian production blends with the utmost rock aggressiveness, changes continuously during the concert; each song is highlighted by different effects. For the first time, Laura had a dance group made up of six dancers, who performed choreographies by world-renowned choreographer Nikos Lagousakos. And then video projections, special effects of a kind never before seen in Italy, and video-mapping, which make the show an exceptional event at the global level, and certainly the most sophisticated, poetic, and all-encompassing tour ever put on the road by an Italian artist. Gold marks the opening, followed by red for "passion", and then the stage suddenly turns into an explosion of nature. A starry night acted as a backdrop for a 3D moon, bringing the show to a close with a big surprise. Costumes, accessories, videos and sets: every single element has been tailor-made for this special occasion by an international team of top level quality and experience. The collaboration with British architect Mark Fisher, for instance, set designer for Pink Floyd and U2, and creator of one-of-a-kind sets for the Cirque du Soleil, at his first ever contribution to an Italian production, and Patrick Woodroffe, lighting designer for leading pop and rock artists, including Bob Dylan, Ac/Dc, Depeche Mode, Rolling Stones, and who had recently been working on This is it, Michael Jackson's last, never-completed show.

During the "Invece No" part of the show, Pausini is lifted up high, and sings the song in a way similar to the one during the Latin Grammy Awards of 2009 wearing a skirt specially designed for the artist by the English fashion brand CuteCircuit. Also, in "Tra te e il mare" a moon is raised up above the spectators heads. In places with limited stage space, some of the props were removed, such as the performances in Brazil having no lifting and in Mexico City having neither lifting nor moon.

Currently, all dates up to 14 February 2012 showed the sold out.

Broadcast and recordings 

To promote both the album and the tour, Pausini went to many TV shows and sang much of the songs present on the tour. This includes "Che tempo che fa" (where she sang "Bastava" and "Troppo tempo") and the Chiambretti Sunday Show on 9 November 2011.

Pausini recently confirmed that the DVD in Italian and Spanish were recorded, respectively, in Bologna (on 17 April 2012) and in Madrid (on 20 April). Also, she declared that during the Winter, there would not be many concerts due to her having to mix and give both DVDs their final format. On Pausini's official Facebook page, Pausini confirmed that the DVD will be released on the end of 2012. On 27 November 2012, the CD+DVD Inedito Special Edition was released in both Spanish and Italian.

On 15 September 2012, along with news of her pregnancy, Pausini confirmed that both DVDs will be released on 27 November 2012 and that the final single of the album Inedito will be "Celeste".

The bilingual performance of the song "Resta in Ascolto/Escucha Atento" that took place in London during the tour was recorded professionally and this live audio was included in both versions of the album "20 – The Greatest Hits" and its Spanish-language counterpart, "20 – Grandes Exitos", that Pausini released a year after the end of this world tour.

Accident 
In March, Laura returned to Italy starting from Ancona, but the tour is suspended due to the incident occurred 5 March 2012 at PalaCalafiore of Reggio Calabria. Around 2 am, a structural failure brought down and move the metal structure above the stage that has fallen on some workers intent at that time to fix the aerial lighting. Matthew Armellini, rigger, roman age 31, was shot and killed in full. Two other workers were injured in a non-serious and were transported to the United Hospitals for treatment, bringing various fractures and bruises. That were setting the stage is of medium size, a structure already used on other occasions and never had any trouble. The Prosecutor's Office of Reggio Calabria has initiated an investigation and the seizure of the entire structure. The fire department after the emergency phase of the surveys have begun to determine the dynamics and causes of the accident. A similar incident occurred causing the victim It was on 12 December 2011 during the Ora 2011–2012 Tour of Jovanotti in Palatrieste in Trieste. After two weeks of suspension in respect of mourning, the tour starts from Florence going on in the city of Caserta, Genoa, Turin, Treviso and Acireale.

Setlist

Tour dates 

Festivals and other miscellaneous performances
Lucca Summer Festival
Moon and Stars
Monte-Carlo Sporting Summer Festival

Cancellations and rescheduled shows

Box office score data (Billboard)

Personnel 

Band
Bruno Zucchetti: piano, keyboard
Paolo Carta: guitar, musical direction
Nicola Oliva: electric guitar
Matteo Bassi: electric bass
Emiliano Bassi: drum

Backing vocalists
Roberta Granà: backing vocals
Monica Hill: backing vocals
Gianluigi Fazio: backing vocals

Dancers
Stefano Benedetti
Valentina Beretta
Bruno Centola
Santo Giuliano
Luca Paoloni
Erika Simonetti
Tiziana Vitto

Creative direction
Mark Fisher: stage designer
Patrick Woodroffe: lighting designer
Catherine Buyse Dian: costume designer
Nikos Lagousakos: choreographer

References

External links 
 Laura Pausini – Official website

2011 concert tours
2012 concert tours
Laura Pausini concert tours

it:Tour di Laura Pausini#Inedito World Tour 2011-2012